The R575 is a Regional Route in South Africa.

Route
Its northern origin is the R555 just west of Middelburg, Mpumalanga. It heads south-south-west to end at the R544 just north of Vandyksdrif.

References

Regional Routes in Mpumalanga